Jabłonica may refer to the following places:
Jabłonica, Masovian Voivodeship (east-central Poland)
Jabłonica, Subcarpathian Voivodeship (south-east Poland)
Jabłonica, Świętokrzyskie Voivodeship (south-central Poland)